A Naval Surface Warfare Center (NSWC) is part of the Naval Sea Systems Command (NAVSEA) operated by the United States Navy.  NAVSEA Warfare Centers supply the technical operations, people, technology, engineering services and products needed to equip and support the Fleet and meet the warfighter's needs. The Warfare Centers are the Navy's principal Research, Development, Test and Evaluation (RDT&E) assessment activity for surface ship and submarine systems and subsystems. Additionally, the Warfare Centers provide depot maintenance and In-Service Engineering support to ensure that the systems fielded today perform consistently and reliably in the future.

NAVSEA currently operates eight Surface Warfare Centers;
 NSWC Carderock, Maryland 
 NSWC Corona, California 
 NSWC Crane, Indiana 
 NSWC Dahlgren, Virginia 
 NSWC Indian Head, Maryland 
 NSWC Panama City, Florida 
 NSWC Philadelphia, Pennsylvania 
 NSWC Port Hueneme, California 

NAVSEA also operates two Undersea Warfare Centers;
 NUWC Washington 
 NUWC Newport, Rhode Island 

The largest of the Navy's five systems commands, NAVSEA engineers build and support America's Fleet of ships and combat systems. Accounting for nearly one-fifth of the Navy's budget, NAVSEA manages more than 150 acquisition programs and has more than 53,000 civilian and military employees at 33 activities in 16 states.

See also
 Joint Expeditionary Forensics Facilities, which are run from the Dahlgren Division.

References

External links

  NSWC official website
 NSWC Corona Division

United States Navy organization